Cupidesthes is a genus of butterflies in the family Lycaenidae. The species of this genus are found in the Afrotropical realm. The genus Cupidesthes was erected by Per Olof Christopher Aurivillius in 1895.

Species
Cupidesthes albida (Aurivillius, 1923)
Cupidesthes arescopa Bethune-Baker, 1910
Cupidesthes caerulea Jackson, 1966
Cupidesthes cuprifascia Joicey & Talbot, 1921
Cupidesthes eliasi Congdon, Kielland & Collins, 1998
Cupidesthes jacksoni Stempffer, 1969
Cupidesthes leonina (Bethune-Baker, 1903)
Cupidesthes lithas (Druce, 1890)
Cupidesthes mimetica (Druce, 1910)
Cupidesthes minor Joicey & Talbot, 1921
Cupidesthes paludicola (Holland, 1891)
Cupidesthes paralithas Bethune-Baker, 1926
Cupidesthes pungusei Collins & Larsen, 2005
Cupidesthes robusta Aurivillius, 1895
Cupidesthes salvatoris Belcastro & Larsen, 2005
Cupidesthes thyrsis (Kirby, 1878)
Cupidesthes vidua Talbot, 1929
Cupidesthes ysobelae Jackson, 1966

References

External links

 Royal Museum of Central Africa Images

Lycaenesthini
Lycaenidae genera